9 Circles is a play by Bill Cain based on the military career and subsequent civilian trial of murderer Steven Dale Green.

Cain is a Jesuit priest. The play's title refers to Dante Alighieri's Inferno—in which Dante navigates a descent into the "nine circles of hell". In Cain's play, Green passes through his discharge from the Army and various judicial and administrative procedures, roughly paralleling the nine circles of Dante's Inferno.  Cain structured the play so other cast members would return to play multiple characters, at each different circle.

The play won praise for being nuanced, and not taking the easy path of demonizing the protagonist.  However, Chris Jones, reviewing a Chicago production of the play, reported that audience members concluded the play meant to imply that Green, who was originally from Midland, Texas, which had been United States President George W. Bush's primary home, had the assistance of the President himself in clearing his entry into the Army in spite of his criminal record.

The script won the Steinberg Award.  Cain is the only playwright to have two plays win this award two years in a row.

References

2010 plays
Plays based on actual events
American plays
Works based on poems